The Avon and Somerset Police and Crime Commissioner is the police and crime commissioner, an elected official tasked with setting out the way crime is tackled by Avon and Somerset Police in the English counties and unitary authorities of Bristol, Bath and North East Somerset, North Somerset, South Gloucestershire and Somerset. The post was created in November 2012, following an election held on 15 November 2012, and replaced the Avon and Somerset Police Authority. Mark Shelford was elected to the role in the May 2021 election.

List of Avon and Somerset Police and Crime Commissioners

Election results

2012 Avon and Somerset Police and Crime Commissioner election

2016 Avon and Somerset Police and Crime Commissioner election

2021 Avon and Somerset Police and Crime Commissioner election

References

External links

Police and crime commissioners in England
Politics of Bristol
Politics of Somerset